The 2012 Franken Challenge was a professional tennis tournament played on clay courts. It was the 26th edition of the tournament which was part of the 2012 ATP Challenger Tour. It took place in Fürth, Germany between 4 and 10 June 2012.

Singles main draw entrants

Seeds

 1 Rankings are as of May 28, 2012.

Other entrants
The following players received wildcards into the singles main draw:
  Kevin Krawietz
  Maximilian Marterer
  Alexander Ritschard
  Jan-Lennard Struff

The following players received entry from the qualifying draw:
  André Ghem
  David Guez
  Yuri Schukin
  Marc Sieber

Champions

Singles

 Blaž Kavčič def.  Sergiy Stakhovsky, 6–3, 2–6, 6–2

Doubles

 Arnau Brugués-Davi /  João Sousa vs.  Rameez Junaid /  Purav Raja, 7–5, 6–7(4–7), [11–9]

External links
Official Website

Franken Challenge
Franken Challenge
Franken Challenge
Franken Challenge